The 1965 British Grand Prix was a Formula One motor race held at Silverstone on 10 July 1965. It was race 5 of 10 in both the 1965 World Championship of Drivers and the 1965 International Cup for Formula One Manufacturers. The 80-lap race was won by Lotus driver Jim Clark after he started from pole position. Graham Hill finished second for the BRM team and Ferrari driver John Surtees came in third.

Race report 
The race itself was dramatic. Clark led away from pole with Hill close behind. With 16 laps to go, the BRM driver had begun experiencing brake issues and was 35 seconds adrift of the leading Lotus. Then the Scot started to lose oil pressure, which was getting worse every lap. Clark – thinking fast – chose to nurse his car to the finish by killing the engine through the fast corners. This meant that he lost at least 2 seconds per lap, which allowed Hill to close up rapidly. At the chequered flag, Clark was still running, but his lead had shrunk to a mere 3 seconds.

Classification

Qualifying

Race

Championship standings after the race

Drivers' Championship standings

Constructors' Championship standings

 Notes: Only the top five positions are included for both sets of standings.

References

British Grand Prix
British Grand Prix
Grand Prix